Giovanni Arduino (born 30 June 1970 in Turin) is a fiction writer, freelance editor, translator and consultant from Moncalieri, Turin, Italy.

His best-selling novels span various genres such as young adult, dark fantasy, modern fables, erotica and pop culture. Arduino's work has been published in Italy, the United States, Japan, Germany and Spain. Arduino has written under many different pseudonyms such as Joe Arden and Jonathan Snow but has mostly used his real name since 2003 for novels as Chiudimi le labbra (Lain Books, Rome, 2005) and Mai come voi (Sperling & Kupfer, Milan, 2004).

Giovanni Arduino has been a scout, senior editor and editor-at-large for Sperling & Kupfer Editori, Milan, Italy, since the mid-1990s. He has introduced Italian readers to an eclectic mix of foreign authors such as Jim Carroll, Nicholas Sparks, Mark Leyner, Poppy Z. Brite, Ben Sherwood, Marilyn Manson, Rosemary Altea, Sherman Alexie, James O'Barr, Francesca Lia Block, Neale Donald Walsch, Stephen Chbosky, Marley & Me'''s John Grogan and a vast array of media-related products, ranging from Pokémon and Beverly Hills, 90210 to Hamtaro, Dawson's Creek, Desperate Housewives and Buffy the Vampire Slayer''.

In October 2006 he left Sperling & Kupfer Editori for newborn Elliot Edizioni, Rome.

In September 2010 Giovanni Arduino left Elliot Edizioni (that he contributed to create), Vivalibri (the Elliot publisher he helped to grow) and Ultra (the hyper-pop Vivalibri imprint that spawned a nice quota of best-selling books).

Since October 2010 he's translating, editing and writing as a professional freelancer.

External links 
 Official Giovanni Arduino Website

1966 births
21st-century Italian novelists
Living people
People from Moncalieri
Italian male novelists
21st-century Italian male writers
Writers from Piedmont